Plectostoma obliquedentatum is a species of air-breathing land snail with an operculum, a terrestrial gastropod mollusk in the family Diplommatinidae.

Distribution 
It is site-endemic to Sabah, Borneo, Malaysia.

References

External links

 Webster N. B., Van Dooren T. J. & Schilthuizen M. (2012). "Phylogenetic reconstruction and shell evolution of the Diplommatinidae (Gastropoda: Caenogastropoda)". Molecular Phylogenetics and Evolution 63(3): 625-638. .

Diplommatinidae
Gastropods described in 1994
Taxobox binomials not recognized by IUCN